Tanner Cohen is an American stage, film and television actor, and singer.

Career
In 2006, Cohen appeared as Tad Becker in five episodes of the American soap opera As the World Turns. He appeared in the 2007 thriller The Life Before Her Eyes. In 2008, he made his leading film debut as Timothy in Were the World Mine, an independent musical film based on A Midsummer Night's Dream. He also contributed to the soundtrack. He had taken voice lessons for a year.

In 2010, Cohen appeared opposite Andy Ridings in Over and Over, a play produced as part of the New York International Fringe Festival (FringeNYC). The play ran from August 18 to August 28 at the Studio @ Cherry Lane, then again from September 9 through 25 as part of The FringeNYC Encore Series.

In 2013, Cohen appeared in Getting Go: The Go Doc Project in the role of a shy college grad (Doc) who devises to shoot a documentary about the New York City nightlife scene to meet the go-go dancer he is obsessed with.

Filmography

Personal life
Cohen is Jewish. He graduated from UCLA in 2009, and is openly gay.
His brother, David Oliver Cohen, is a television actor.

In 2010, he recorded and posted a video in connection with the It Gets Better Project and The Trevor Project.

References

External links
 
 

American male film actors
American male pop singers
American male stage actors
American male television actors
21st-century American male actors
American gay actors
American gay musicians
Jewish American male actors
Place of birth missing (living people)
Jewish American musicians
LGBT Jews
Living people
21st-century American Jews
1986 births